This is a list of diplomatic missions of Ethiopia, excluding honorary consulates.

In July 2021, the Ethiopian government announced it will be closing at least 30 overseas missions in light of the financial costs brought by the COVID-19 pandemic and the Tigray War. 

In 2022, Ethiopia reopened a few of its previously closed embassies.

Current missions

Africa

Americas

Asia

Europe

Oceania

Multilateral organizations

Addis Ababa (Permanent Mission)

Geneva (Permanent Mission)
New York City (Permanent Mission)

Gallery

Closed missions

Africa

Americas

Asia

Europe

Notes

See also
 Foreign relations of Ethiopia
 List of diplomatic missions in Ethiopia
 Visa policy of Ethiopia

References

Ethiopian Ministry of Foreign Affairs

 

 
Diplomatic missions
Ethiopia